Mamadou N'Diaye (born 28 May 1995) is a Senegalese professional footballer who plays as a left-back for  club Le Puy. In 2014, he made one appearance for the Senegal national team.

Honours 
Le Puy

 Championnat National 2: 2021–22

References

1995 births
Living people
Sportspeople from Thiès
Senegalese footballers
Senegal international footballers
Montpellier HSC players
US Avranches players
FC Villefranche Beaujolais players
Le Puy Foot 43 Auvergne players
Championnat National 3 players
Championnat National 2 players
Ligue 1 players
Championnat National players
Association football defenders
Senegalese expatriate footballers
Senegalese expatriate sportspeople in France
Expatriate footballers in France